Doña Lupe is a 1985 short horror film written and directed by Guillermo del Toro. It is del Toro's ninth short film, though the first eight remain unreleased. Del Toro filmed Doña Lupe at 19 years of age; reviewers have noted that the film "feels like the work of an amateur artist getting to grips with his craft".

In 2008, Doña Lupe saw its first commercial release as part of the Cinema 16: World Short Films DVD collection. In the audio commentary, del Toro apologizes for the film's poor quality and recounts anecdotes from its troubled production.

Plot
Policemen Bienvenido and Chato rent rooms in a house owned by Doña Lupe, an elderly woman in financial trouble. Doña Lupe mistrusts the men, but allows them to stay, as she needs the money. When they change the locks and begin smuggling suspicious materials into the house, Doña Lupe decides to take drastic measures.

Cast
 Josefina González de Silva as Doña Lupe
 Jose Luis Vallejo as Bienvenido
 Jaime Arturo Vargas as Chato
 José Luis Vallejo as Bienvenido Almereida
 Jaime Arturo Vargas as Javier "Chato" Cañedo
 Hermilo Barba as Don Jesús
 Javier Cañedo as Mongol

References

External links
 

1985 horror films
1985 short films
Mexican short films
Mexican werewolf films
1980s supernatural horror films
Films set in Mexico
Films shot in Mexico
Films directed by Guillermo del Toro
Films with screenplays by Guillermo del Toro
1980s Spanish-language films
1985 films
1980s Mexican films